Live is a jazz album by American singer Cassandra Wilson, released in 1991.

Reception
The Buffalo News review by Jeff Simon wrote, "Wilson's modal version of "Body and Soul" a la Betty Carter more than makes up for it by being as inventive and powerful as any you're likely to hear from jazz's postmodern generation."

Track listing
 "Don't Look Back" (Jean-Paul Bourelly, Cassandra Wilson) – 5:55
 "Soul Melange" (Steve Coleman, Wilson) – 11:35
 "'Round Midnight" (Thelonious Monk, Cootie Williams, Bernie Hanighen) – 7:58
 "My Corner of the Sky" (Wilson) – 9:43
 "Desperate Move" (Coleman) – 12:07
 "Body and Soul" (Edward Heyman, Robert Sour, Frank Eyton, Johnny Green) – 9:31
 "Rock This Calling" (Coleman, Wilson) – 12:15

Personnel
Cassandra Wilson – vocals
Kevin Bruce Harris – bass
James Weidman – piano, synthesizer
Mark Johnson – drums
Production notes
Stefan F. Winter – producer
Johannes Wohlleben – engineer, mixing
Adrian Von Ripka – engineer, mixing
Paul Cameron – assistant engineer
Sara Schwartz – artwork, illustrations
Andreas Weise –photography

Chart positions

References 

Cassandra Wilson albums
1991 live albums
JMT Records live albums